The Sweet Embrace Stakes is an Australian Turf Club Group 2 Thoroughbred horse race for fillies aged two years old, over a distance of 1200 metres at Randwick Racecourse in Sydney, Australia in  late February or early March.

The winner of this race receives automatic entry to the Golden Slipper Stakes.

History
The race is named in honour of Sweet Embrace, winner of the 1967 Golden Slipper Stakes.
Fillies that have captured the Sweet Embrace – Golden Slipper double include: Dark Eclipse (1980), Ha Ha (2001), Crystal Lily (2010), Fireburn (2022)

Name

1979–1998 - Sweet Embrace Stakes
1999 - Lone Star Steakhouse and Saloon Stakes  
2000 onwards - Sweet Embrace Stakes

Venue
 Before 1995 - Canterbury Park Racecourse
 1996–1999 - Rosehill Gardens Racecourse
 2000–2005 - Canterbury Park Racecourse
 2006–2010 - Randwick Racecourse
 2011 - Warwick Farm Racecourse
 2012 - Randwick Racecourse
 2013 - Warwick Farm Racecourse
 2014 - Randwick Racecourse
 2015 - Warwick Farm Racecourse
 2016 onwards - Randwick Racecourse

Grade
1979–1986 -  Listed Race
1987–2012 -  Group 3
2013 onwards - Group 2

Winners

 2023 - Lazzago
 2022 - Fireburn
 2021 - Four Moves Ahead
 2020 - Hungry Heart
 2019 - Anaheed
 2018 - Seabrook
 2017 - One More Honey 
 2016 - Scarlet Rain 
 2015 - Always Allison 
 2014 - Believe Yourself
 2013 - Romantic Moon
 2012 - Jade Marauder
 2011 - Shared Reflections
 2010 - Crystal Lily
 2009 - Headway
 2008 - Stripper
 2007 - Chinchilla Rose
 2006 - Universal Queen
 2005 - Carry On Cutie
 2004 - Burning Sands
 2003 - Legally Bay
 2002 - Victory Vein
 2001 - Ha Ha
 2000 - Dynamic Love
 1999 - Countess Christie
 1998 - Rubicall
 1997 - All The Chat
 1996 - Flapper
 1995 - Millrich
 1994 - Shadowy Outline
 1993 - Rock Review
 1992 - Skating
 1991 - Shadea
 1990 - Paklani
 1989 - A Little Kiss
 1988 - Scollata
 1987 - Postage Due
 1986 - Khaptivaan
 1985 - Speed Check
 1984 - Vain Display
 1983 - Purpose
 1982 - Jade Lace
 1981 - Black Shoes
 1980 - Dark Eclipse
 1979 - Ingenue

See also
 List of Australian Group races
 Group races

References

External links 
First three placegetters Sweet Embrace Stakes (ATC)

Horse races in Australia